A powder boy or powder monkey manned naval artillery guns as a member of a warship's crew, primarily during the Age of Sail. His chief role was to ferry gunpowder from the powder magazine in the ship's hold to the artillery pieces, either in bulk or as cartridges, to minimize the risk of fires and explosions. The function was usually fulfilled by boy seamen of 12 to 14 years of age. Powder monkeys were usually boys or young teens, selected for the job for their speed and height: they were short and could move more easily in the limited space between decks and would also be hidden behind the ship's gunwale, keeping them from being shot by enemy ships' sharpshooters. These powder monkeys held no official naval rank on the ships that they sailed on. Some women and older men also worked as powder monkeys.

Many of the powder monkeys in the Royal Navy that ended up on ships were part of the poor working class. The Marine Society, which encouraged youths to join the Royal Navy recruited them by providing clothes, bedding, and a rudimentary education. In the mid-1790s, it is estimated that the Marine Society was sending five or six hundred boys a year to the fleet, although not all of these boys became powder monkeys. Of the boys who were recruited by the Marine Society, most had no other option than to join the navy, as their parents could not afford to raise them. However, a significant number had familial ties to the sea. This group had cousins, fathers, and even grandfathers who were sailors, thus making them want to continue family traditions and exploit their sense of adventure.

The United States did not have an established navy until after its independence in 1776, and even then it was loosely organized. The United States Navy started using powder monkeys in the late 1700's after modeling its structure upon the Royal Navy. The two navies fought against each other in the War of 1812, during which time both sides utilized the special physical gifts that powder monkeys offered on board their warships. After the War of 1812, boys under the age of twelve were forbidden by the U.S. Navy from serving on ships. However, boys above that age were still used as powder monkeys until the Spanish–American War at the end of the nineteenth century.

The Royal Navy first began using the term "powder monkey" in the 17th century. The term was later used, and continues to be used in some countries, to signify a skilled technician or engineer who engages in blasting work, such as in the mining or demolition industries. In such industries, a "powder monkey" is also sometimes referred to as a "blaster".

References

External links
 History of HMS Victory: Crew

Children in war
Marine occupations
Obsolete occupations
Combat occupations
Naval ranks
Nautical terminology
Military ranks of the Royal Navy
Gunpowder